This is the discography of British pop group Guys 'n' Dolls.

Albums

Studio albums

Compilation albums

Singles

Notes

References

Discographies of British artists
Pop music group discographies